Australia is one of the most LGBT-friendly countries in the world. In a 2013 Pew Research poll, 79% of Australians agreed that homosexuality should be accepted by society, making it the fifth most supportive country in the survey behind Spain (88%), Germany (87%), and Canada and the Czech Republic (both 80%). With a long history of LGBT rights activism and an annual three-week-long Mardi Gras festival, Sydney is one of the most gay-friendly cities in Australia and in the world.

Terminology 

The term LGBTI is increasingly used in Australia, rather than just LGBT, with the I denoting intersex people. Organisations that include intersex people as well as LGBT people include the National LGBTI Health Alliance and community media. Also used are the terms LGBTQI and LGBTQIA, with the A denoting asexual people and Q queer people.

Demographics

In 2014, over half a million people or 3.0% of the adult population identified as gay, lesbian, or "other". This included 268,000 people who identified as gay or lesbian and 255,000 people who identified as having an "other" sexual orientation.

Same-sex couples
In 2011, same-sex couples accounted for 0.7% of the total number of couples. It increased to 0.9% in the 2016 Census. In 2016, there were 23,700 male same-sex couples and 23,000 female same-sex couples. The pattern of more male than female same-sex couples has been consistent since 1996, although the degree of difference has decreased in each census, more significantly in the 2016 Census.

In 2016, same-sex couples accounted for 1.4% of all couples in the Australian Capital Territory, the highest proportion of any state or territory. However, only 2.6% of all same-sex couples in Australia lived in the Australian Capital Territory. The next highest proportions were in New South Wales and Victoria, where same-sex couples accounted for 1.0% of all couples. Almost two-thirds (63%) of same-sex couples lived in New South Wales (35.8%) or Victoria (27.1%), whereas only 0.8% lived in the Northern Territory and 1.8% in Tasmania.

The 2016 Census noted that Aboriginal and Torres Strait Islander people are more likely to live with a same-sex partner than non-Indigenous people. About 1.2% of Aboriginal and Torres Strait Islander people lived with a same-sex partner, while that of non-Indigenous people was 0.9%.

Children growing up in same-sex families
The 2011 Australian Census counted 6,300 children living in same-sex families, up from 3,400 in 2001, making up one in a thousand of all children in couple families (0.1%). In 2016, it increased to 10,500 children, accounting for 0.2% of all children in families.

Income of same-sex couples
Individuals in same-sex relationships were more likely to have higher personal incomes than those in opposite-sex relationships. In 2016, 23% of men in same-sex relationships earned $2,000 or more a week, compared with 18% of men in opposite-sex relationships. For women, the difference was greater. Women in same-sex relationships were twice as likely to be earning $2,000 or more a week as women in opposite-sex relationships (14% compared with 6%).

Religious affiliation
A 2008 study of LGBT Australians found that 35% were raised Protestant, 30% raised Catholic and 29% raised irreligious.

According to the 2016 Census, LGBT people were most likely to report they had no religion (67%). However, 32% said they were Christian. This was in contrast to heterosexual people, for whom Christianity was the leading affiliation (59%) followed by not having a religion (28%). Same-sex partners were more likely to be affiliated with Buddhism than those in opposite-sex relationships (3.9% compared to 2.7%) and less likely to be affiliated with Hinduism (0.5% compared with 2.4%) or Islam (0.7% compared with 2.4%).

History

Queer Indigenous Australian history is little-known, with limited evidence of formal structures or roles except in the Tiwi Islands.

Rights

As a federation, Australia's states and territories 
are responsible for many laws affecting LGBT and intersex rights. Between 1975 and 1997, the states and territories progressively repealed anti-homosexuality laws that dated back to the colonial era. Since 2016, each jurisdiction has an equal age of consent for all sexual acts. All jurisdictions offer expungement schemes to clear the criminal records of people charged or convicted for consensual sexual acts that are no longer illegal.

Beginning on 12 September 2017, a national plebiscite titled "Should the law be changed to allow same-sex couples to marry? " was commenced. 61.6% of total votes were in support of the legalisation of same-sex marriage, leading to Australia recognising same-sex marriage on 9 December 2017. States and territories began granting domestic partnership benefits and relationship recognition to same-sex couples from 2003 onwards, with federal law recognising same-sex couples since 2009 as de facto relationships. Alongside marriage, same-sex relationships may be recognised by states or territories in various ways, including through civil unions, domestic partnerships, registered relationships and/or as unregistered de facto relationships.

LGBT adoption and parenting in Australia is legal nationwide, with the Northern Territory the last jurisdiction to pass an adoption equality law in March 2018. Discrimination on the basis of sexual orientation and gender identity or expression is prohibited in every state and territory, with concurrent federal protections for sexual orientation, gender identity and intersex status since 1 August 2013.

Transgender rights in Australia and intersex rights in Australia vary between jurisdictions, with QLD and NSW legally requiring a person to undergo sex reassignment surgery - before changing the legal sex on birth certificates. Non-binary Australians can legally register a "non-specific" sex on federal legal documents and in the records of some states and territories.

Summary table

Social conditions

Public attitudes
A 2005 paper by the Australia Institute, Mapping Homophobia in Australia, found that 35% of people aged 14 or above considered homosexuality to be immoral, with Queensland and Tasmania having the highest levels of anti-gay sentiment and Victoria the lowest. Overall the most anti-LGBT areas in the study were the Moreton area of country Queensland (excluding the Gold Coast and Sunshine Coast), Central and South-West Queensland and the Burnie/Western district of Tasmania, where 50% considered homosexuality to be immoral, while the least homophobic were inner-city Melbourne (14%), central Perth (21%) and central Melbourne (26%).

A 2018 Ipsos survey of the attitudes towards transgender people in several countries found 71% of Australian respondents thought that the country was becoming more tolerant of transgender people.

Indigenous LGBTI community 
Gender diverse and transgender Aboriginal Australians and Torres Strait Islanders are often referred to as sistergirls and brotherboys. The level of acceptance varies with each community and its elders. In 2015, Dameyon Bonson established Black Rainbow as a mental health support and suicide prevention service for LGBTI Indigenous Australians, given that they often suffer dual discrimination through both racism and homophobia/transphobia, and are 45 times more likely to commit suicide than the general population.

References

See also
LGBT rights in Australia
Australian Marriage Law Postal Survey
LGBT Culture in Sydney